Oath-Bound is a 1922 American silent drama film directed by Bernard J. Durning and starring Dustin Farnum, Ethel Grey Terry, and Fred Thomson.

Cast
 Dustin Farnum as Lawrence Bradbury 
 Ethel Grey Terry as Constance Hastings 
 Fred Thomson as Jim Bradbury 
 Maurice 'Lefty' Flynn as Ned Hastings 
 Norman Selby as Hicks 
 Aileen Pringle as Alice 
 Bob Perry as Gang Leader 
 Herschel Mayall as Captain Steele

References

Bibliography
 Solomon, Aubrey. The Fox Film Corporation, 1915-1935: A History and Filmography. McFarland, 2011.

External links

1922 films
1922 drama films
Silent American drama films
Films directed by Bernard Durning
American silent feature films
1920s English-language films
Fox Film films
1920s American films